A list of notable people from Oldenburg, Germany

Honorary citizens
 1917: Paul von Hindenburg, General and later President of Germany during the Weimar Republic
 1928: Dr. h.c. Helene Lange, Politician (DDP) and women's rights activist
 1963: Prof. Dr. Dr. h.c. Karl Jaspers, philosopher, psychiatrist and political author
 1992: Horst Janssen, printmaker

Famous people from Oldenburg
 1426, Christian of Oldenburg, † 1481, king of the Kalmar Union.
 1460, John V, Count of Oldenburg, † 1526, Count of Oldenburg
 1683, Burkhard Christoph von Munnich, † 1767, military commander, political figure
 1776, May 4: Johann Friedrich Herbart, † August 14, 1841 Göttingen, philosopher, psychologist and teacher
 1815, March 24: Sophie Löwe † November 29, 1866, opera soprano
 1818, December 21: Marie Frederike Amelie, Princess of Oldenburg and Queen of Greece 1836–1862 † Bamberg May 20, 1875
 1848, April 9: Helene Lange, † May 13, 1930 Berlin, politician, teacher and women's rights activist
 1852, November 16: Friedrich August, Duke of Oldenburg 1900–1918
 1865, July 22: Dr. Karl Rudolf Heinze, † May 28, 1928 Dresden, prime minister of Saxony October 26 to November 13, 1918, and Governor of Saxony 1923
 1883, February 23: Karl Jaspers, † February 26, 1969 Basel, philosopher and author
 1894, August 17: Otto Suhr, † August 30, 1957 Berlin, politician SPD and Lord Mayor of Berlin
 1934, October 7: Ulrike Meinhof, † May 9, 1976 Stuttgart, journalist and militant (Red Army Faction)
 1945, September 9: Robert Alexy, jurist and legal philosopher
 1957: Heiko Daxl, media artist
 1959, January 17: Andrea Clausen, actress at Burgtheater in Vienna
 1973, August 14: Thyra von Westernhagen, Hanoverian princess by marriage
 1974, May 28: Hans-Jörg Butt, football player
 1982, September 2: Johannes Bitter, handball player, goalie of the German international team
 1983, September 22: Klaas Heufer-Umlauf, host and actor

Famous people who worked in Oldenburg
 Horst Janssen, * November 14, 1929 Hamburg, † August 31, 1995 Oldenburg, artist, lived in Oldenburg

References

People from Oldenburg (city)
Oldenburg